Dorothy Shay (April 11, 1921 – October 22, 1978) was an American popular comedic recording artist in the late 1940s and early 1950s, who later became a character actress. She was known as the "Park Avenue Hillbillie".

Early life
Shay was born Dorothy Sims in Jacksonville, Florida. When she began her career as a "straight" singer, she took vocal lessons to lose her Southern accent. She sang for the USO during World War II. Dorothy changed her name to "Shay" so she wouldn't be confused with Ginny Simms, another vocalist of the day, choosing "Shay" to honor her mentor Betty Shay (later Betty Corday). While performing with Morton Gould and his orchestra, she performed an encore, "Uncle Fud", a hayseed novelty number that became popular and launched her solo singing career.

"The Park Avenue Hillbillie"
She signed with Columbia Records and recorded a series of hit records. Her biggest hit was "Feudin' and Fightin'" in 1947, the year she joined Spike Jones's CBS radio show as the female vocalist. That same year, her album, "Dorothy Shay (The Park Avenue Hillbillie) Sings", was rated #1 in Billboard magazine's Best-Selling Popular Albums. This album was part of Columbia's initial catalogue of 101 LP records which were the first LPs ever released. Shay was the first female artist to have a #1 album on the Billboard chart.

In her singing engagements, she performed dressed as a sophisticated urbanite while talking like a rural Southerner. She was popular in nightclubs, radio, and television. The 1951 Abbott and Costello movie Comin' Round The Mountain featured special introductory billing as Dorothy Shay's first motion picture; she played a nightclub singer involved in a hillbilly feud. The film was an excellent showcase for her musical and comic talents; all five musical numbers were performed by Shay. 

Shay was the musical guest on the second (television) season premiere of The Jack Benny Program in November 1951.  She performed at Dwight D. Eisenhower's Inaugural Ball in 1953. She recorded for Capitol Records and Imperial Records where she recorded a rockabilly song titled "Hunky Dory".  In 1970 she appeared as Widow Krebs in the TV Western The Virginian in the episode titled "You Can Lead a Horse to Water."

Personal life
She was married briefly to Dick Looman from 1958 to 1959. After a period of inactivity in the 1960s, she returned to show business as a character actress in the 1970s. She had a recurring role as Thelma, first owner of the Dew Drop Inn, in the TV series The Waltons.

Death
Shay died of a heart attack on October 22, 1978, in Santa Monica, California. Upon her death, the writers of The Waltons wrote her character off, with the mention that she sold the Dew Drop Inn and moved to California.

Discography

References

External links
 The Dorothy Shay Fan Pages; no longer functional Nov 23, 2019. 
 Big Bands and Big Names: Dorothy Shay, Bigbandsandbignames.com; accessed March 19, 2015.

1921 births
1978 deaths
Imperial Records artists
Burials at Westwood Village Memorial Park Cemetery
Musicians from Jacksonville, Florida
Actresses from Jacksonville, Florida
20th-century American actresses
20th-century American singers
20th-century American women singers